Voice of the Whistler is a 1945 American mystery film noir directed by William Castle and starring Richard Dix, Lynn Merrick, and Rhys Williams. It was the fourth of Columbia Pictures' eight "Whistler" films produced in the 1940s, all based on the radio drama The Whistler.

Plot
A dying millionaire, trying to do good, marries his penniless young nurse so she can inherit his wealth and live in comfort. He then miraculously recovers, but the troubles for both husband and wife are just beginning.

Cast
 Richard Dix as John Sinclair, alias John Carter
 Lynn Merrick as Joan Martin Sinclair
 Rhys Williams as Ernie Sparrow
 James Cardwell as Fred (Doc) Graham
 Tom Kennedy as Ferdinand / Hammerlock

References

External links
 
 
 
 
Review of film at Variety

1945 films
1945 mystery films
American mystery films
American black-and-white films
Columbia Pictures films
Film noir
Films based on radio series
Films directed by William Castle
Works set in lighthouses
The Whistler films
1940s English-language films
1940s American films